Andrei Vaștag (born 21 March 1994) is a Romanian footballer who plays as a midfielder for Voința Lupac.

International career

Vaștag made his debut for Romania U-17 on 21 September 2010 in a game against Kazakhstan U-17. He played with the under-17 team at the 2011 UEFA European Under-17 Football Championship.

Personal life
He is the son of the former great boxer, Francisc Vaștag.

References

External links
 
 
 Andrei Vaștag at Romaniansoccer

1994 births
Living people
Sportspeople from Reșița
Romanian footballers
Association football midfielders
Liga I players
Liga II players
Liga III players
AFC Săgeata Năvodari players
FC Viitorul Constanța players
FC Dinamo București players
CSM Corona Brașov footballers
CS Sportul Snagov players
CSM Deva players
CSM Reșița players
ASC Oțelul Galați players
Romanian expatriate footballers
Romanian expatriate sportspeople in Austria
Expatriate footballers in Austria